Khalwara is a village in Tehsil Phagwara, Kapurthala district, in Punjab, India. The village is administrated by a Sarpanch who is an elected representative of village as per the constitution of India and Panchayati raj (India).

Transport 
Phagwara Junction Railway Station and Mandhali Railway Station are the nearby railway stations to Khalwara, while Jalandhar City Rail Way station is 25 km away from the village. The village is 120 km away from Sri Guru Ram Dass Jee International Airport in Amritsar and another nearby airport is Sahnewal Airport in Ludhiana which is located 42 km away from the village.

References

External links
  Villages in Kapurthala
 Kapurthala Villages List

Villages in Kapurthala district